Stigmella andina is a moth of the family Nepticulidae and is endemic to Peru.

External links
Nepticulidae and Opostegidae of the world

Nepticulidae
Moths described in 1915
Endemic fauna of Peru
Moths of South America